Franche may refer to:

Franche, Worcestershire, 
Franche (grape), another name for the French wine grape Chenin blanc
Franche-Comté ("Free County"), a region of France